Leopoldo Artucio (1903-1976) was an Uruguayan architect and architectural historian. Artucio was also Dean of the Faculty of Architecture in Montevideo.

Selected publications
 Montevideo y la arquitectura moderna (Ed. Nuestra Tierra nº 5, Montevideo, 1971).

References

1903 births
1976 deaths
Uruguayan people of Italian descent
University of the Republic (Uruguay) alumni
Academic staff of the University of the Republic (Uruguay)
Uruguayan architectural historians
20th-century Uruguayan historians
20th-century Uruguayan architects